István Fazekas (9 September 1929 – 20 July 1979) was a Hungarian boxer. He competed in the men's light heavyweight event at the 1952 Summer Olympics.

References

External links
 
 
 
 

1929 births
1979 deaths
Hungarian male boxers
Olympic boxers of Hungary
Boxers at the 1952 Summer Olympics
Sportspeople from Jász-Nagykun-Szolnok County
Light-heavyweight boxers
20th-century Hungarian people